The following is a partial list of civilian casualties in the Second Intifada. According to the International Institute for Counter-Terrorism, 887 (78 percent) of the 1,137 Israelis killed in attacks from September 2000 – 2005 were civilians. Another 8,341 Israelis were wounded during this period, including 5,676 civilians and 2,665 security forces personnel. The majority of casualties were caused by suicide bombings, though Israelis have also been killed by planted bombs, shootings, stonings, stabbings, lynchings, rockets, and other methods of attack.

According to B'Tselem, in the ten years from 2000-2010, of the 6371 Palestinians killed by Israeli forces, at least 2996 did not participate in hostilities when killed, and 1317 were minors. Out of 1083 Israelis killed, 741 were civilians (124 minors).

Background 
A 2007 study of Palestinian suicide bombings that took place from September 2000 through August 2005 found that 39.9 percent of the suicide attacks were carried out by Hamas, 25.7 percent by the Palestinian Islamic Jihad (PIJ), 26.4 percent by Fatah, 5.4 percent by the Popular Front for the Liberation of Palestine (PFLP) and 2.7 percent by other organizations. The youngest victim of the Second Intifada was an Israeli infant who was nine hours old and had not yet been named, though several pregnant women have also been killed.

The Israeli civilians' deaths do not show a high regularity in their age or gender distribution, as Palestinian militants chose to attack whichever civilian targets were accessible. The targets included the Dolphinarium discotheque massacre, a place frequented by Israeli youth, and open-air markets and public buses, which are disproportionately used by women and the elderly. A number of attacks against Israeli civilians have been considered massacres while others, such as the murder of a pregnant woman and her four young daughters, have been called crimes against humanity.

Israeli non-combatant casualties

Palestinian non-combatant casualties

The following is a partial List of Palestinian civilian casualties in the Second Intifada. The portion of the killed since the beginning of the Second Intifada that were civilians is disputed. According to B'Tselem, in the decade from 27 September 2000 to 27 September 2010,  6371 Palestinians were killed  at least 2996 of whom did not participate in hostilities when they were killed. 
A study conducted by Israel's International Institute for Counter-Terrorism (ICT) concluded that 1,099 were non-combatants, or 35 percent. According to the study, 103 (9 percent) were female and 996 (91 percent) were male. Professor and historian Benny Morris came to a similar conclusion in his 2009 retrospective book One States, Two States, saying that about one third of the Palestinian deaths had been civilians.

Another 609 Palestinian fatalities were inflicted by other Palestinians.

Foreigner casualties in the Second Intifada

During the course of the second intifada, a total of 64 foreign citizens were killed.

Casualties by Israel

Iain Hook – English UNRWA aid project manager shot and killed by an IDF soldier, who mistook a cellphone in his hand for a gun or grenade, in Jenin, November 22, 2002.
Rachel Corrie – American ISM activist killed in an IDF bulldozer accident on March 16, 2003.
Tom Hurndall – English ISM volunteer fatally shot by an IDF sniper in Gaza, April 11, 2003. Ruled accidental.
James Miller – Welsh film-maker shot and killed by the IDF in Gaza, May 2, 2003. No prosecution, as exact cause of death could not be proven.

Casualties by Palestinians

Constantin Straturula, 52, of Romania – Killed in a Palestinian bomb attack May 10, 2001.
Virgil Martinescu, 29, of Romania – Killed in a Palestinian bomb attack May 10, 2001.
Aleksei Lupalu, 16, of the Ukraine – Killed in a Palestinian suicide bombing June 2, 2001.
Sergei Panchenko, 20, Ukraine. – Killed in a Palestinian suicide bombing June 2, 2001
Giora Balash, 60, from São Paulo, Brazil – Killed in a Palestinian suicide bombing August 9, 2001.
Shoshana Yehudit (Judy) Greenbaum, 31, from Passaic, New Jersey, United States – Killed in a Palestinian suicide bombing August 9, 2001.
Rosaria Reyes, 42, Filipino citizen – Killed in a Palestinian suicide bombing December 2, 2001.
Avraham (Avi) Boaz, 71, American citizen – Kidnapped at a PA security checkpoint in Beit Jala on January 15, 2001; bullet-ridden body found in Beit Sahur.
Catherine Berruex, 25, of Switzerland and Turgut Cengiz Toytunç of Turkey, observers at the TIPH - killed in Hebron by Islamic Jihad March 26, 2002 
Perla Hermele, 79, of Stockholm, Sweden – Killed in a Palestinian suicide bombing March 27, 2002.
Zuhila Hushi, 47, Chinese citizen, of Gilo – Killed in a Palestinian suicide bombing April 12, 2002.
Lin Chin Mai, 34, Chinese citizen – Killed in a Palestinian suicide bombing April 12, 2002.
Chai Zin Chang, 32, Chinese citizen – Killed in a Palestinian suicide bombing April 12, 2002.
Tatiana Igelski, 43, of Moldova – Killed in a Palestinian suicide bombing June 19, 2002.
Adrian Andres, 30, of Romania – Killed in a Palestinian suicide bombing July 17, 2002.
Li Bin, 33, of China – Killed in a Palestinian suicide bombing July 17, 2002.
Janis Ruth Coulter, 36, of New York (US) – Killed by a Palestinian remotely detonated concealed bomb July 31, 2002. It was carried out by an East Jerusalem-based Hamas cell whose members are serving multiple life sentences in Israeli prisons for that attack and others.
David Gritz, 24, of Massachusetts (US-France) – Killed by a Palestinian remotely detonated concealed bomb July 31, 2002. It was carried out by an East Jerusalem-based Hamas cell whose members are serving multiple life sentences in Israeli prisons for that attack and others.
Marla Bennett, 24, of California (US) – Killed by a Palestinian remotely detonated concealed bomb July 31, 2002. It was carried out by an East Jerusalem-based Hamas cell whose members are serving multiple life sentences in Israeli prisons for that attack and others.
Benjamin Blutstein, 25, of Pennsylvania (US) – Killed by a Palestinian remotely detonated concealed bomb July 31, 2002. It was carried out by an East Jerusalem-based Hamas cell whose members are serving multiple life sentences in Israeli prisons for that attack and others.
Dina Carter, 37, of Jerusalem (US) – Killed by a Palestinian remotely detonated concealed bomb July 31, 2002. It was carried out by an East Jerusalem-based Hamas cell whose members are serving multiple life sentences in Israeli prisons for that attack and others.
Adelina Kononen, 37, of the Philippines – Killed in a Palestinian suicide bombing August 4, 2002.
Rebecca Roga, 40, of the Philippines – Killed in a Palestinian suicide bombing August 4, 2002.
Jonathan (Yoni) Jesner, 19, of Glasgow, Scotland – Killed in a Palestinian suicide bombing September 19, 2002.
Mircea Varga, 25, a tourist from Romania – Killed in a Palestinian suicide bombing November 21, 2002.
Ion (Nelu) Nicolae, 34, of Romania – Killed in a Palestinian suicide bombing January 5, 2003.
Mihai Sabau, 38, of Romania – Killed in a Palestinian suicide bombing January 5, 2003.
Li Peizhong, 41, of China – Killed in a Palestinian suicide bombing January 5, 2003.
Steven Arthur Cromwell, 43, of Ghana – Killed in a Palestinian suicide bombing January 5, 2003.
Krassimir Mitkov Angelov, 32, of Bulgaria – Killed in a Palestinian suicide bombing January 5, 2003.
Ivan Gaptoniak, 46, of Ukraine – Killed in a Palestinian suicide bombing January 5, 2003.
Guo Aiping, 47, of China – Killed in a Palestinian suicide bombing January 5, 2003.
Zhang Minmin, 50, of China – died of her injuries on January 13, 2003 from a Palestinian suicide bombing.
Haile Abraha Hawki, 56, a foreign worker from Eritrea – Killed in a Palestinian suicide bombing June 11, 2003.
Krastyu Radkov, 46, of Bulgaria – Killed in a Palestinian shooting attack June 30, 2003 west Jenin while driving a truck. Al-Aqsa Martyrs' Brigades claimed responsibility.
Goldie Taubenfeld, 43, of New Square, New York – Killed in a Palestinian suicide bombing August 19, 2003.
Shmuel Taubenfeld, 3 months, of New Square, New York – Killed in a Palestinian suicide bombing August 19, 2003.
Maria Antonia Reslas, 39, of the Philippines – Killed in a Palestinian suicide bombing August 19, 2003.
John Eric Branchizio, 37, of Texas – Killed by a Palestinian bomb October 15, 2003 in the Gaza Strip, along with two other American diplomatic personnel.
John Martin Linde, Jr., 30, of Missouri – Killed by a Palestinian bomb October 15, 2003 in the Gaza Strip, along with two other American diplomatic personnel.
Mark T. Parson, 31, of New York – Killed by a Palestinian bomb October 15, 2003 in the Gaza Strip, along with two other American diplomatic personnel.
Patricia Ter'n Navarrete, 33, of Ecuador – Killed by a Palestinian terrorist in a shooting attack November 19, 2003, north of Eilat.
Mehbere Kifile, 35, of Ethiopia – Killed in a Palestinian suicide bombing January 29, 2004.
 Weerachai Wongput, 37, from the Nong Han District of the northeastern province of Udon Thani in Thailand – Killed by shrapnel from mortar fire on June 21, 2004. Hamas claimed responsibility.
Pratheep Nanongkham, 24, of Thailand – Killed when armed terrorists infiltrated the hothouse area of Kfar Darom in the central Gaza Strip on October 6, 2004. Hamas claimed responsibility.
The 2004 Sinai bombings, masterminded by Iyad Saleh and perpetrated by a Palestinian terrorist group, resulted in the deaths of 34 people. Of them were 12 Israelis, 15 Egyptians, 2 Italians, 1 Russian, and 1 American.
Bi Shude, 46, of China – Killed when a Qassam rocket hit a packing shed in Ganei Tal, in the Gaza Strip on June 7, 2007. The Islamic Jihad claimed responsibility for the attack.
Shmuel Mett, 21, of Britain – Stabbed to death near Jaffa Gate in Jerusalem on August 24, 2005.
Jitladda Tap-arsa, 20, a female Thai national, was killed by a mortar while working in a greenhouse in the Gush Katif settlement of Ganei Tal.
Rozalia Beseneyi, 48, of Romania – Killed in a Palestinian suicide bombing April 17, 2006.
Piroşca Boda 50, of Romania – Killed in a Palestinian suicide bombing April 17, 2006.
Marcel Cohen, 73, of Nice, France – Killed in a Palestinian suicide bombing April 17, 2006.
Daniel Wultz, 16, of Weston, Florida, USA – died of his wounds on May 14, 2006 from a Palestinian suicide bombing.
Angelo Frammartino, 24, of Italy – Stabbed to death August 10, 2006.
Carlos Andrés Mosquera Chávez, 21, of Ecuador – Killed by a Palestinian sniper as he was working in the fields of Kibbutz Ein Hashlosha on January 15, 2008. Hamas claimed responsibility.

Gallery

See also
List of Palestinian civilian casualties in the Second Intifada
List of Israeli civilian casualties in the Second Intifada
List of Palestinian suicide attacks
Israeli casualties of war

References

 
Terrorist incidents in Asia in the 2000s
Terrorist incidents in Israel in the 2000s